Nicholas "Nick" Winmar (born 27 April 1991) is an Australian rules footballer who played for the St Kilda Football Club in the Australian Football League (AFL).

Winmar is the second cousin of former St Kilda and Western Bulldogs player Nicky Winmar. St Kilda drafted him with the 32nd selection in the 2009 AFL Draft from Claremont Football Club in the West Australian Football League (WAFL).

Winmar made his debut in round 9, 2011 against the Melbourne Football Club and played the following week against Fremantle Football Club before being dropped back to the Victorian Football League (VFL). Winmar was then named as an emergency several times towards the end of the 2011 season.

He was delisted at the conclusion of the 2012 season, despite being contracted until the end of the 2013 season.

References

External links
 
 
 

Living people
1991 births
St Kilda Football Club players
Australian rules footballers from Western Australia
Claremont Football Club players
Casey Demons players
Sandringham Football Club players
Indigenous Australian players of Australian rules football
Sydney University Australian National Football Club players